Dorothea Lambert Chambers (née Dorothea Katherine Douglass, 3 September 1878 – 7 January 1960) was a British tennis player. She won seven Wimbledon women's singles titles and a gold medal at the 1908 Summer Olympics.

Tennis
In 1900, Douglass made her singles debut at Wimbledon, and after a bye in the first round, lost her second-round match to Louisa Martin. Three years later, she won her first of seven ladies singles titles. On 6 April 1907, she married Robert Lambert Chambers and was became known by her married surname Lambert Chambers.

In 1908, she won the gold medal in the women's singles event at the 1908 Summer Olympics after a straight-sets victory in the final against compatriot Dora Boothby.

She wrote Tennis for Ladies, published in 1910. The book contained photographs of tennis techniques and contained advice on attire and equipment.

In 1911, Lambert Chambers won the women's final at Wimbledon against Dora Boothby 6–0, 6–0, the first player to win a Grand Slam singles final without losing a game. The only other female player to achieve this was Steffi Graf when she defeated Natalia Zvereva in the 1988 French Open final.

In 1919, Lambert Chambers played the longest Wimbledon final up to that time: 44 games against Frenchwoman Suzanne Lenglen. Lambert Chambers held two match points at 6–5 in the third set but eventually lost to Lenglen 8–10, 6–4, 7–9.

Lambert Chambers only played sporadic singles after 1921 but continued to compete in doubles until 1927. She made the singles quarterfinals of the U.S. Championships in 1925, and from 1924 to 1926, she captained Britain's Wightman Cup team. In the 1925 Wightman Cup, she played, at the age of 46, a singles (against Eleanor Goss) and doubles match and won both.  In 1928 she turned to professional coaching.

Lambert Chambers posthumously was inducted into the International Tennis Hall of Fame in 1981. She died in Kensington, London in January 1960.

Grand Slam finals

Singles: 11 (7 titles, 4 runner-ups) 

* This was the all-comers final as Muriel Robb did not defend her 1902 Wimbledon title, which resulted in the winner of the all-comers final winning the challenge round, and thus, Wimbledon in 1903 by walkover.
** This was the all-comers final as Ethel Thomson Larcombe did not defend her 1912 Wimbledon title, which resulted in the winner of the all-comers final winning the challenge round and, thus, Wimbledon in 1913 by walkover.

Doubles: 3 runner-ups

Mixed doubles: 1 runner-up

Badminton
In addition to playing tennis, Lambert Chambers was one of the leading badminton players at the beginning of the 20th century. In 1903, 1904 and 1907, she was the runner-up at the singles event of the All England Badminton Championships.

Personal life
During the First World War, she undertook war work, first at Ealing Hospital, and later at the Little Theatre. She married Robert Lambert Chambers, nephew of John Graham Chambers.

References

External links

 
 
 Book Lawn Tennis for Ladies at Archive.org

1878 births
1960 deaths
English female tennis players
English female badminton players
English Olympic medallists
Olympic gold medallists for Great Britain
Olympic tennis players of Great Britain
People from Ealing
International Tennis Hall of Fame inductees
Tennis players at the 1908 Summer Olympics
Wimbledon champions (pre-Open Era)
Olympic medalists in tennis
Grand Slam (tennis) champions in women's singles
Medalists at the 1908 Summer Olympics
Tennis writers
Tennis people from Greater London
British female tennis players